Events from the year 1744 in Russia

Incumbents
 Monarch – Elizabeth I

Events

  
 
  28 June - The future Catherine the Great, Princess Sophia of Anhalt-Zerbst, fiancee of the heir to the throne, converts to the Russian Orthodox Church and is received with the new name Catherine (Yekaterina or Ekaterina) and the (artificial) patronymic Алексеевна (Alekseyevna, daughter of Aleksey).

Births

 Elena von Rehbinder, industrialist

Deaths

References

1744 in Russia
Years of the 18th century in the Russian Empire